The Men's Freestyle 86 kg is a competition featured at the 2018 European Wrestling Championships, and was held in Kaspiysk, Russia on May 5 and May 6.

Medalists

Results 
 Legend
 F — Won by fall

Final

Top half

Bottom half

Repechage

References 
 

Men's Freestyle 86 kg